Michael Mooney may refer to:

Sportspeople
 Mike Mooney (American football) (1969–2007), National Football League player
 Michael Mooney (sailor) (1930–1985), American sailor, Olympic champion from 1948

Others
 Michael Mooney, writer of the Twitter worm, Mikeyy, from April 2009
 Michael Mooney, former member of the English rock band Spiritualized